P. Krishnamurthy may refer to:

 Krishnamurthy Perumal (born 1943), Indian field hockey player
 Panchapakesa Krishnamurti, Indian scientist and industrialist
 Pochiah Krishnamurthy, Indian cricketer